Wenji: Eighteen Songs of a Nomad Flute (Chinese 文姬 Wenji) is a 2002 Chinese and English language chamber opera by Macao-born American composer Lam Bun-Ching to a libretto by Xu Ying. It based on the story of the girl Cai Wenji.

References

Operas
2002 operas
Chinese western-style operas